"My Place" is a song by American rapper Nelly featuring R&B singer Jaheim. It is the lead single from Nelly's fourth studio album, Suit (2004). The song is about Nelly inviting a girl over to his house, and the female backing vocals are provided by Kim Johnson. The track samples three songs: Labelle's "Isn't It a Shame", DeBarge's "I Like It", and Teddy Pendergrass's "Come Go with Me", so the respective songwriters are given credits.

"My Place" was released on July 19, 2004, to American radio. In the United Kingdom, Ireland, Australia, and New Zealand, the song was issued as a double A-side with "Flap Your Wings". Upon the single's release, it reached number four on the US Billboard Hot 100 and topped the charts in the United Kingdom, Australia, and New Zealand.

Music video
The music video starts at the last scene of the video for "Flap Your Wings", Nelly's girlfriend and her friends catch Nelly up the hill with a girl and his girlfriend asks who she is. Nelly tries to explain but his girlfriend is too reluctant to listen and throws her chain at him. Nelly picks it up and takes it with him. Nelly tries to get reach of his girlfriend by sending presents and text but she declines his text and ignores his gift. Nelly tries to make things up with his girlfriend but she refuses and pushes him and goes back into her fashion boutique shop and throws his gift in the camera. Nelly continues rapping until the next scene is when his ex-girlfriend is with her mates at a restaurant and making their imaginations. She imagines of her and her ex-boyfriend having sex. Nelly and his girlfriend are in a black screen thinking about each other and realising how they have feelings for each other and how much they love each other and Nelly throws a photo frame containing a picture of him and his girlfriend inside it and his girlfriend appears to be crying. At a summer club, Nelly tracks down his girlfriend and they talk and Nelly apologizes and puts the necklace she threw at him before back on her neck and they finally make up and embrace.

Track listings

US 12-inch single
A1. "Flap Your Wings" (dirty album version) – 4:04
A2. "Flap Your Wings" (dirty with straight vox) – 4:04
A3. "Flap Your Wings" (instrumental) – 4:04
B1. "My Place" (dirty album version) – 4:32
B2. "My Place" (instrumental) – 5:40

UK CD single
 "My Place" (radio edit) – 4:32
 "Flap Your Wings" (radio edit) – 4:04
 "Hot in Herre" (remix) – 3:45
 "My Place" (video) – 4:28
 "Flap Your Wings" (video) – 3:56

UK 12-inch single
A1. "My Place" (album version) – 5:40
A2. "My Place" (instrumental) – 5:40
B1. "Flap Your Wings" (album version) – 4:04
B2. "Flap Your Wings" – 4:04

European CD single
 "My Place" (radio edit) – 4:32
 "Flap Your Wings" – 4:04

European maxi-CD single
 "My Place" (radio edit) – 4:33
 "My Place" (album) – 5:38
 "Flap Your Wings" – 4:05
 "My Place" (video) – 4:54

Australian CD single
 "My Place" (radio edit) – 4:32
 "My Place" (album version) – 5:40
 "Flap Your Wings" – 4:04
 "Don't Stop" – 3:57

Credits and personnel
Credits are lifted from the US promo CD liner notes.

Studios
 Recorded at Derrty Studio (Los Angeles) and Platinum Sound Recording (New York City)
 Mixed at Platinum Sound Recording (New York City)
 Mastered at The Hit Factory Mastering (New York City)

Personnel

 Nelly – writing, vocals
 Dorian Moore – writing
 Randy Edelman – writing
 El DeBarge – writing
 William DeBarge – writing
 Etterlene DeBarge – writing
 Kenneth Gamble – writing
 Leon Huff – writing
 Jaheim – vocals

 Kim Johnson – background vocals
 Doe Mo' Beats – production
 Carl Nappa – recording (Derrty)
 Serge Tsai – recording (Platinum Sound)
 Rich Travali – mixing
 Chip Karpells – mixing assistant
 Herb Powers Jr. – mastering
 Kevin Law – A&R

Charts and certifications

Weekly charts

Year-end charts

Certifications

Release history

References

2004 singles
2004 songs
Contemporary R&B ballads
Music videos directed by Benny Boom
Nelly songs
Number-one singles in Australia
Number-one singles in New Zealand
Songs written by El DeBarge
Songs written by Kenny Gamble
Songs written by Leon Huff
Songs written by Nelly
Songs written by Randy Edelman
UK Singles Chart number-one singles
Universal Records singles